Themistoklis Tselios (born 6 October 1997) is a Greek professional footballer who plays as a goalkeeper for Super League 2 club Anagennisi Karditsa.

Career

Ergotelis 
On 8 July 2021, Greek Super League 2 club Ergotelis announced the signing of Tselios, on a two-year contract.

Personal life 
His twin brother, Ilias, is also a professional footballer.

References 

1997 births
Living people
Greece youth international footballers
Gamma Ethniki players
Football League (Greece) players
Super League Greece 2 players
A.E. Sparta P.A.E. players
Panargiakos F.C. players
Aittitos Spata F.C. players
Diagoras F.C. players
Ergotelis F.C. players
Anagennisi Karditsa F.C. players
Association football goalkeepers
Footballers from Athens
Greek footballers